Syzygium myhendrae is a species of plant in the family Myrtaceae. It is native to Kerala and Tamil Nadu in India.

References

myhendrae
Flora of Kerala
Flora of Tamil Nadu
Endangered plants
Taxonomy articles created by Polbot